The Fiat Tagliero Building is a Futurist-style service station in Asmara, Eritrea. It was completed in 1938 and designed by the Italian engineer Giuseppe Pettazzi.

Historical background

The Fiat Tagliero is noted as one of the foremost Art Deco buildings of Italian Asmara.

Conceived as a simple petrol station owned by dr. Tagliero (the Fiat concessionary in Asmara), the building was designed by eng. Pettazzi as a futuristic structure that resembled an aeroplane incorporating a central tower with office space, cashiers desk and shop — and supporting a pair of huge 15m cantilevered, reinforced concrete wings. 

During construction, local authorities required each wing to be supported by pillars, and original plans, found in 2001, depicted the supports. Pettazzi maintained the supports were unnecessary and reportedly settled the argument by threatening to kill the contractor if the supports were not removed. 

In the end the supports were removed and the wings held.

During WW2 the Fiat Tagliero was partially hit by British bombing, but survived without huge damage: the wings proved to be very well built and did not collapse.

The building, used until recently as a Shell service station, remains structurally sound and has not been damaged during numerous conflicts affecting the Horn of Africa during the second half of the twentieth century. Restored in 2003, the service station is "Category I" listed in Eritrea, meaning no part of the building may be altered: it is one of the most important Art Deco buildings that gave to the city of Asmara the UNESCO approval to be a World Heritage Site in July 2017.

Notes

See also
Asmara: a Modernist City of Africa (UNESCO World Heritage)
 Giuseppe Pettazzi
 Italian Eritrea
 Cinema Impero, another famous "Art Deco" building in Asmara

External links
 Video about Tagliero building

Futurist architecture
Transport infrastructure completed in 1938
Italian fascist architecture
Buildings and structures in Asmara
Shell plc buildings and structures
Historic filling stations
Modernist architecture in Eritrea
1938 establishments in Africa
Aviation art